Sally's Apizza is a pizzeria in the Wooster Square neighborhood of New Haven, Connecticut. Sally's Apizza also has locations in Stamford, Connecticut and Fairfield, Connecticut.

Fare

Sally's serves New Haven-style thin-crust apizza, which is baked in coal-fired brick pizza ovens. By default, a New Haven pizza is a "plain" pizza topped with only tomato sauce, and Parmesan. Sally's is a small restaurant, and patrons must often wait in line, sometimes even for hours.

History
The restaurant was purchased for $500 in 1938 by Filomena Consiglio, sister of Frank Pepe, who was the owner of Frank Pepe Pizzeria Napoletana, another Wooster Street pizza restaurant.  Sal Consiglio, a son of Filomena, ran it until his death in May 1989.  His wife Flo died in September 2012. While their children Richard and Robert still operate the restaurant, they sold it to an unnamed buyer in 2017. In 2021, a second location was opened in Stamford, Connecticut. In 2022, a third location was opened in Fairfield, Connecticut.

Sally's was featured in the 2019 documentary film about New Haven-style apizza, Pizza A Love Story.

See also
 List of Italian restaurants

References

External links
 
 Sally's Apizza at pizzatherapy.com
 Sally's Apizza review at Slice
 Barstool Pizza Review - Sally's Apizza (New Haven, CT)

Italian-American culture in Connecticut
Pizzerias in the United States
Tourist attractions in New Haven, Connecticut
Restaurants in Connecticut
Buildings and structures in New Haven, Connecticut
Economy of New Haven, Connecticut
Restaurants established in 1938
1938 establishments in Connecticut